David González Plata (born 28 May 1991), known as Nono, is a Spanish professional footballer who plays as a winger for Polish club Korona Kielce.

Club career
Nono was born in Badajoz, Extremadura. After finishing his formation with Rayo Vallecano, he made his senior debuts with the B-team in the 2009–10 season, being promoted from the Tercera División.

On 16 June 2010, Nono appeared in his first match as professional, playing the last 13 minutes of a 4–0 home win over Recreativo de Huelva in the Segunda División. He continued to be all but associated with the reserves during his spell, however.

In August 2013, Nono signed with UD Almería B from the Segunda División B. On 24 July of the following year he moved to UCAM Murcia CF, also in the third level. He was a regular starter for the club during the following campaigns, helping in their first-ever promotion to the second level.

Nono scored his first professional goal on 2 October 2016, netting the equalizer in a 2–2 home draw against CD Mirandés. The following 22 June, he signed a two-year contract with fellow second division club AD Alcorcón.

On 2 July 2019, Nono signed a five-year deal with Extremadura UD, still in the second division, but left the club a year later after their relegation. On 14 September 2020, he agreed to a three-year contract with fellow league team CD Tenerife.

On 31 August 2021, Nono terminated his contract with Tenerife, and signed a two-year deal with UD Ibiza just hours later. On 9 September 2022, his contract with Ibiza was terminated by mutual consent.

On 8 December 2022, Nono joined Polish Ekstraklasa club Korona Kielce on a one-and-a-half-year contract.

References

External links

1991 births
Living people
Sportspeople from Badajoz
Spanish footballers
Footballers from Extremadura
Association football wingers
Segunda División players
Segunda División B players
Tercera División players

Rayo Vallecano B players
Rayo Vallecano players
UD Almería B players
UCAM Murcia CF players
AD Alcorcón footballers
Extremadura UD footballers
CD Tenerife players
UD Ibiza players
Korona Kielce players
Spanish expatriate footballers
Expatriate footballers in Poland
Spanish expatriate sportspeople in Poland